Microchirita is a genus of flowering plants in the family Gesneriaceae, subfamily Didymocarpoideae.

Species
 Microchirita aratriformis (D.Wood) A.Weber & D.J.Middleton	
 Microchirita barbata (Sprague) A.Weber & D.J.Middleton	
 Microchirita bimaculata (D.Wood) A.Weber & D.J.Middleton	
 Microchirita caerulea (R.Br.) Yin Z.Wang	
 Microchirita caliginosa (C.B.Clarke) Yin Z.Wang	
 Microchirita elphinstonia (Craib) A.Weber & D.J.Middleton	
 Microchirita hamosa (R.Br.) Yin Z.Wang	
 Microchirita involucrata (Craib) Yin Z.Wang	
 Microchirita lavandulacea (Stapf) Yin Z.Wang	
 Microchirita marcanii (Craib) A.Weber & D.J.Middleton	
 Microchirita micromusa (B.L.Burtt) A.Weber & D.J.Middleton	
 Microchirita mollissima (Ridl.) A.Weber & D.J.Middleton	
 Microchirita oculata (Craib) A.Weber & D.J.Middleton	
 Microchirita rupestris (Ridl.) A.Weber & D.J.Middleton
 Microchirita sahyadriensis (Punekar & Lakshmin.) A.Weber & D.J.Middleton
 Microchirita sericea (Ridl.) A.Weber & Rafidah
 Microchirita tubulosa (Craib) A.Weber & D.J.Middleton
 Microchirita viola (Ridl.) A.Weber & Rafidah

References

 The Plant List entry

External links
 

Didymocarpoideae
Gesneriaceae genera